Rima Khachatryan (April 3, 1938 – April 10, 2020) was an Armenian educator, chemist, educational innovator, Honored Pedagogue of Armenia and author of textbooks for medical colleges.

She is known for her efforts to enhance nurse education in Armenia, that led to establishment of a dozen medical colleges in rural areas as well as two scientifically based nursing schools in Yerevan during 1975-2015. 

In the 1990s Rima Khachatryan introduced an innovative methodology aimed at learning outcomes - Underperforming Student Success Mode. Based on four fundamental values - dignity, truthfulness, fairness, and responsibility and freedom - it was about transforming the educational experience itself and made a significant impact on educational reforms in post-soviet Armenia.

Background and education
Rima Khachatryan was the youngest of three children born into a close-knit, happy family of émigrés – survivors of the Armenian genocide. Her parents - Mkhitar Khachatryan and Siranush Martirosyan - had emigrated from Alashkert and Van respectively. They sought refuge and met in an orphanage of the Near East Relief in Alexandropol.

In 1960 she graduated from the Armenian State Pedagogical University, and was qualified as a teacher of Chemistry and Biology. In 1962-1965 she attended the Armenian National Agrarian University, and in 1969 received Diploma in Chemistry from the School of Pedagogy of the National Polytechnic University of Armenia.

Teaching and promoting nurse education
From September 1, 1965, until her death in 2020 - for 55 years - Rima Khachatryan taught pharmaceutical, inorganic, analytical, and organic chemistry at the Yerevan Basic Medical College (in 2002–2013 – Head of the Department of Pharmaceutics).
“She believed that the purpose of education should not be reduced to the acquisition of a certain set of skills, but rather the realisation of one's potential and the ability to use those skills in the real life”, Armenian media reported in 2020. 

In 1987, as a finalist of the pan-USSR socialist emulation in pedagogy, she was awarded with an Honorary Certificate for exceptional achievements by the Central Committee of the Communist Party of the Soviet Union, Council of Ministers, All-Union Central Council of Trade Unions and All-Union Leninist Young Communist League.

In 2007–2009 she authored and published two textbooks for the students of medical colleges, namely the two-volume "Inorganic Chemistry" and "Analytical Chemistry". For about one-and-a-half decades both textbooks have been the core learning resources for a dozen state medical colleges around the country. 

“Their [the textbooks’] main advantage is the consistency of the instructional design and the learner-centered approach to presenting the content. Being able to apply the theoretical knowledge through the application and practice activities, the student is given a broader opportunity for self-learning", News.am stated in 2020 calling them "textbooks that are never outdated".

She led the efforts of introducing in medical colleges of Armenia the new educational program for “Pharmaceutics” discipline that attracted substantial attention of the professional pedagogical community.

Trade union activities

In 1969-2020, for five decades she led the trade union of the Medical College, which media recorded as "a record leadership experience in itself". She considered "two fundamental elements – schools and civil society – to be major topics needing attention to encourage nurse education system".

During the First Nagorno-Karabakh War for the first time in Armenia she introduced the principle of “the trade union treasury as a cash register for mutual support" in the Yerevan Medical College to honor those who served and to raise money for the College's veteran students and their families.

She also significantly contributed to the elaboration of the RA Law on Medical Assistance and Service to the Population adopted in 1996, where for the first time ever "issues regarding legal regulation of nursing, assessment of the workload and fair pay of nurses and mid-level practitioners were touched upon"

Recognition and legacy

Awards and decorations 
The Armenian government presented many decorations and awards to Rima Khachatryan. She was named Honoured Pedagogue of Armenia in 2017, was awarded the "Anania Shirakatsi" Medal in 2008, Commemorative Medal of the Prime Minister of Armenia in 2018 and Gold Medal of the Ministry of Education and Science of Armenia (2005).

During the Soviet period she was awarded the Medal "Veteran of Labour" in 1984. She also received the Medal of the General Confederation of Trade Unions (2017).

In 2020 the Executive Coaching & Training Institute was named after Rima Khachatryan.

"Rima Khachatryan" scholarship
A merit-based scholarship was established in 2020 in memory of Rima Khachatryan for scholars and research fellows of the Executive Coaching and Training Institute (ECTI). It was set up to enhance lifelong learning and self-development. The fellowships are awarded by the ECTI Board of Trustees. A total of ten scholarships are awarded annually.

Commemoration 
The most natural photo-portrait of Rima Khachatryan was made by Soviet Armenian photographer Armenak Hovhannisyan in his private studio in 1982, which later appeared on the cover of her book “Untold Story” published by the NewMag.

In 2012 the portrait of Rima Khachatryan in a traditional guise of the Armenian mother with an icon of the Virgin and the Child in her hands was painted by Zurab Modebadze  (Tempera).

In 2020 the sculpture "On a Step Above Heaven" by David Minasyan (Դավիթ Մինասյան) was placed on the Nork Hills in Yerevan, Armenia(Marble), and Ricardo Sanz (pintor) produced her portrait from photographs of different years (Canvas).

Gallery

Bibliography

Textbooks

References

External links
 Rima Khachatryan: “Munich: The Terminus” on NewMag
 Rima Khachatryan: Biography
 ‘Rima Khachatryan’ scholarships
RIMA KHACHATRYAN: The Daughter of an Émigré on NewMag
RIMA KHACHATRYAN: The Daughter of an Émigré Kindle Edition on Amazon.com
RIMA KHACHATRYAN: The Daughter of an Émigré on Kobo.com 

Armenian physicians
Nursing education
Nursing researchers
Nursing theorists